Before the Acts of Union 1707, the barons of the shire of Renfrew elected commissioners to represent them in the unicameral Parliament of Scotland and in the Convention of the Estates. The number of commissioners was increased from two to three in 1690.

From 1708 Renfrewshire was represented by one Member of Parliament in the House of Commons of Great Britain.

List of shire commissioners
 1593: Sir Patrick Houston of that Ilk
 1593: Sir John Maxwell of Pollok
 1612: names unknown
 1617: Sir John Maxwell, 1st Baronet, of Pollok
 1617: Sir Archibald Stewart of Castlemilk
 1621: William Semple of Fulwood
 1633: Patrick Fleming of Barrochan
 1633, 1661–62: Sir Archibald Stewart of Blackhall
 1639–41: Sir Patrick Maxwell of Newark
 1639–41, 1645–47: Sir Ludovic Houston of that Ilk
 1643: William Cunningham of Craigends
 1643–44, 1644, 1649, 1667: John Shaw of Greenock
 1644–45, 1650: John Brisbane of Bishopton
 1645: Sir John Hamilton of Orbiston
 1645–47: Sir James Muir of Caldwell
 1648: Alexander Porterfield of that Ilk
 1649–50: Sir George Maxwell of Pollok
 1661: Patrick Houston, fiar of that Ilk
 1667: Sir Archibald Stewart of Blackhall
 1669–70: Sir Archibald Stewart of Castlemilk
 1669–74, 1678, 1681–82: Sir John Shaw of Greenock
 1681–82, 1685–86: William Hamilton of Orbistoun 
 1685–86, 1702–07: John Houston, younger of that Ilk (Sir John from 1696)
 1689–93, 1695–96, 1698–99: Sir John Maxwell of Pollok (appointed Lord Justice Clerk, 1699)
 1689–95: William Coningham of Craigends (expelled)
 1690–98: John Caldwell of that Ilk (died c.1700) 
 1700-02: Alexander Porterfield of that Ilk 
 1700–01, 1702–04: John Stewart, younger of Blackhall
 1700–02, 1702–07: Sir Robert Pollok of that Ilk

References
M. D. Young, The Parliaments of Scotland: Burgh and Shire Commissioners (1993) vol. II, p. 798.

See also
 List of constituencies in the Parliament of Scotland at the time of the Union

Constituencies of the Parliament of Scotland (to 1707)
Constituencies disestablished in 1707
1707 disestablishments in Scotland
Politics of Renfrewshire
History of Renfrewshire